The Serie B 1972–73 was the forty-first tournament of this competition played in Italy since its creation.

Teams
Lecco, Ascoli and Brindisi had been promoted from Serie C, while Catanzaro, Mantova and Varese had been relegated from Serie A.

Final classification

Results

References and sources
Almanacco Illustrato del Calcio - La Storia 1898-2004, Panini Edizioni, Modena, September 2005

Serie B seasons
2
Italy